Submarine Patrol is a 1938 film directed by John Ford and starring Richard Greene, Nancy Kelly and Preston Foster.  The supporting cast features George Bancroft, Elisha Cook, Jr., John Carradine, Maxie Rosenbloom, Jack Pennick, Ward Bond and an unbilled Lon Chaney Jr. as a Marine sentry. The movie was partly written by William Faulkner.

Cast
 Richard Greene as Perry Townsend III
 Nancy Kelly as Susan Leeds
 Preston Foster as John C. Drake
 George Bancroft as Captain Leeds
 Slim Summerville as Spuds Fickett
 J. Farrell MacDonald as Sails Quincannon
 Warren Hymer as Rocky Haggerty
 Douglas Fowley as Pinky Brett
 Dick Hogan as Johnny Miller
 Elisha Cook Jr. as Rutherford Davis Pratt ("The Professor")
 Ward Bond as Seaman Olaf Swanson
 George E. Stone as Irving Goldfarb
 Jack Pennick as Guns McPeek
 "Slapsie Maxie" Rosenbloom as Marine sentry Sgt. Joe Duffy
 John Carradine as McAllison
 Henry Armetta as Luigi
 Joan Valerie as Anne
 Robert Lowery as Sparks, radioman
 Lon Chaney Jr. as Marine sentry (unbilled)

References

External links 
 
 

Films directed by John Ford
1938 films
1938 adventure films
American black-and-white films
20th Century Fox films
Submarine films
Films produced by Darryl F. Zanuck
American adventure films
1930s English-language films
1930s American films